The War may refer to:

 The most recent major conflict in a given area, or
World War II as the last major global conflict

Art
 The War (Dix engravings), a 1924 series of etchings by Otto Dix
 The War (Dix triptych), a 1932 oil painting by Otto Dix

Film and television
 The War (1994 film), a 1994 film starring Elijah Wood and Kevin Costner
 The War (miniseries), a 2007 television documentary about World War II by Ken Burns
 The Chaser's War on Everything or simply The War, an Australian television comedy series

Music
 The War (album), a 2017 studio album by South Korean-Chinese boy group EXO
 "The War" (Angels & Airwaves song)
 "The War" (The New Power Generation song)
 "The War", a 2016 song by Leeland from the album Invisible
 "The War", a 2020 song by Joyner Lucas from the album ADHD

Other
 The War (boxing), a 1985 bout between Marvin Hagler and Thomas Hearns
 The War (comics), a 1980s Marvel Comics series

See also
War (disambiguation)